Conway Springs USD 356 is a public unified school district headquartered in Conway Springs, Kansas, United States.  The district includes the communities of Conway Springs, Viola, Anson, and nearby rural areas.

Schools
The school district currently has three schools:
 Conway Springs High School
 Conway Springs Middle School
 Kyle Trueblood Elementary

See also
 Kansas State Department of Education
 Kansas State High School Activities Association
 List of high schools in Kansas
 List of unified school districts in Kansas

References

External links
 

School districts in Kansas